Sevaldi (also Romanized as  Sovalde, Sevaldī and Savaldi; also known as Barzan, Sāldī, Seh Baleh, Sevalī, and Sūlvī) is a village in Qushkhaneh-ye Bala Rural District, Qushkhaneh District, Shirvan County, North Khorasan Province, Iran. At the 2006 census, its population was 615, in 152 families.

References 

Populated places in Shirvan County